Giorgi Gabidauri (born 6 December 1979) is a Georgian professional football player.

Career statistics

References

External links
 
 

1979 births
Living people
Jews from Georgia (country)
Georgian emigrants to Israel
Footballers from Georgia (country)
FC Dinamo Tbilisi players
Anorthosis Famagusta F.C. players
Panachaiki F.C. players
FC Shakhter Karagandy players
Georgia (country) international footballers
Gabala FC players
Hapoel Bnei Lod F.C. players
Maccabi Umm al-Fahm F.C. players
Liga Leumit players
Cypriot First Division players
Expatriate footballers from Georgia (country)
Expatriate footballers in Cyprus
Expatriate footballers in Greece
Expatriate footballers in Kazakhstan
Expatriate footballers in Azerbaijan
Expatriate sportspeople from Georgia (country) in Cyprus
Expatriate sportspeople from Georgia (country) in Greece
Expatriate sportspeople from Georgia (country) in Kazakhstan
Expatriate sportspeople from Georgia (country) in Azerbaijan
Association football midfielders